July 5 - Eastern Orthodox Church calendar - July 7

All fixed commemorations below are celebrated on July 19 by Old Calendar.

For July 6th, Orthodox Churches on the Old Calendar commemorate the Saints listed on June 23.

Saints
 Apostles of the Seventy Archippus, Philemon, and Onesimus (1st century)
 Hieromartyr Asteius, Bishop of Dyrrachium in Macedonia (c. 100)
 Martyrs Marinus and Martha, their children Audifax and Abbacum (Habakkuk), and those with them at Rome (269):  (see also: January 19 - West )
 Cyrinus, the priest Valentine, and Asterius 
 Saint Cointus of Phrygia (Quintus), Confessor and Wonderworker (c. 283)
 Hieromartyr Isaurus the Deacon, and Martyrs Innocent, Felix, Hermias, Basil, Peregrinus, Rufus, and Rufinus, of Apollonia in Macedonia (284)  (see also: June 17)
 Virgin-martyr Lucy of Campania, Martyr Rixius the Imperial Vicar, 24 others beheaded with them, and many other martyrs in Campania, including (301):
 Anthony, Lucian, Isidore, Dion, Diodorus, Cutonius, Arnosus, Capicus, Satyrus, and others.
 Martyrs Apollonius, Alexandrion, and Epimachus.
 Martyr Basil and 69 other martyrs of Scythopolis.  (see also: June 28 )
 Venerable Sisoës the Great of Egypt (429)

Pre-Schism Western saints
 Saint Romulus of Fiesole and Companions, ordained by the Apostle Peter as first pastor of Fiesole, he was martyred with several companions under Domitian (c. 90)
 Saint Tranquillinus, a martyr in Rome connected with St Sebastian (c. 288)
 Saint Dominica, a martyr venerated in Campania who suffered under Diocletian.
 Saint Monenna (or Darerca), an ascetic and Abbess of Sliabh Cuillin in Ireland, foundress of Killeevy Monastery (c. 518)
 Saint Goar of Aquitaine, Hieromonk, hermit, and missionary along the Rhine, Germany (649)
 Saint Seaxburh of Ely (Saxburgh, Sexburga), foundress of the abbey at Minster-in-Sheppey and later Abbess of Ely (699)
 Saint Noyala, a holy virgin from Britain beheaded at Beignan in Brittany.

Post-Schism Orthodox saints
 Venerable Sisoes of the Kiev Caves, Schemamonk of the Kiev Caves (13th century)
 New Monk-martyr Cyril of Hilandar, Mt. Athos, burned alive at Thessalonica (1566)
 Saint Barnabas, Elder, of the Gethsemane Skete of St. Sergius Lavra (1906)

New martyrs and confessors
 New Hieromartyr Euthymius (Lyubovichev), Hieromonk of Optina Monastery (1931)
 New Hieromartyr Theodore (Bogoyavlensky), Hieromonk, of Vostryakovo, Moscow (1943)

Other commemorations
 Translation of the relics of Saint Eudocimus of Cappadocia (9th century)
 Uncovering of the relics of St. Juliana, Princess of Olshansk (16th century)
 Synaxis of the Saints of Radonezh.
 "Bogorodsko-Ufimsky" Icon of the Mother of God (1621)
 Repose of Archimandrite Arsenius (Papacioc) of Romania (2011)

Icon gallery

Notes

References

Sources
 July 6/July 19. Orthodox Calendar (PRAVOSLAVIE.RU).
 July 19 / July 6. HOLY TRINITY RUSSIAN ORTHODOX CHURCH (A parish of the Patriarchate of Moscow).
 July 6. OCA - The Lives of the Saints.
 July 6. The Year of Our Salvation - Holy Transfiguration Monastery, Brookline, Massachusetts. 
 The Autonomous Orthodox Metropolia of Western Europe and the Americas (ROCOR). St. Hilarion Calendar of Saints for the year of our Lord 2004. St. Hilarion Press (Austin, TX). p. 50.
 The Sixth Day of the Month of July. Orthodoxy in China.
 July 6. Latin Saints of the Orthodox Patriarchate of Rome.
 The Roman Martyrology. Transl. by the Archbishop of Baltimore. Last Edition, According to the Copy Printed at Rome in 1914. Revised Edition, with the Imprimatur of His Eminence Cardinal Gibbons. Baltimore: John Murphy Company, 1916. pp. 196–197.
 Rev. Richard Stanton. A Menology of England and Wales, or, Brief Memorials of the Ancient British and English Saints Arranged According to the Calendar, Together with the Martyrs of the 16th and 17th Centuries. London: Burns & Oates, 1892. pp. 313–316.
Greek Sources
 Great Synaxaristes:  6 ΙΟΥΛΙΟΥ. ΜΕΓΑΣ ΣΥΝΑΞΑΡΙΣΤΗΣ.
  Συναξαριστής. 6 Ιουλίου. ECCLESIA.GR. (H ΕΚΚΛΗΣΙΑ ΤΗΣ ΕΛΛΑΔΟΣ). 
  ΙΟΥΛΙΟΣ. Αποστολική Διακονία της Εκκλησίας της Ελλάδος (Apostoliki Diakonia of the Church of Greece).
  06/07/2018. Ορθόδοξος Συναξαριστής. 
Russian Sources
  19 июля (6 июля). Православная Энциклопедия под редакцией Патриарха Московского и всея Руси Кирилла (электронная версия). (Orthodox Encyclopedia - Pravenc.ru).
  6 июля по старому стилю / 19 июля по новому стилю. Русская Православная Церковь - Православный церковный календарь на 2018 год.
  6 июля (ст.ст.) 19 июля 2014 (нов. ст.). Русская Православная Церковь Отдел внешних церковных связей. (DECR).

July in the Eastern Orthodox calendar